Bernard Barmasai (born 6 May 1974 in Keiyo) is an athlete from Kenya. He specialised in steeplechase running but is nowadays a marathoner.

He set the new 3000 metres steeplechase world record of 7:55.72 on 24 August 1997 in Cologne. The record was broken by Brahim Boulami from Morocco in 2001. The time survived as a Kenyan Record until July 2011, when Brimin Kipruto ran a new African Record time of 7:53.64.

Barmasai won the Eurocross in 1997, before going on to win the team gold with Kenya at that year's IAAF World Cross Country Championships.

Barmasai suffered from knee injuries and was mostly sidelined in 2002 and 2003. This prompted him to quit steeplechase and switch to marathons.

Achievements

Marathons 
2004 - Rotterdam Marathon, 15th (marathon debut)
2005 - Amsterdam Marathon, 4th
2006 - Paris Marathon, 3rd
2006 - Amsterdam Marathon, 2nd

References

External links

marathoninfo

1974 births
Living people
People from Elgeyo-Marakwet County
Kenyan male long-distance runners
Kenyan male middle-distance runners
Kenyan male marathon runners
Kenyan male steeplechase runners
Olympic athletes of Kenya
Athletes (track and field) at the 1998 Commonwealth Games
Athletes (track and field) at the 2000 Summer Olympics
World Athletics Championships medalists
Commonwealth Games medallists in athletics
Commonwealth Games silver medallists for Kenya
African Games gold medalists for Kenya
African Games medalists in athletics (track and field)
Goodwill Games medalists in athletics
Athletes (track and field) at the 1995 All-Africa Games
Competitors at the 1998 Goodwill Games
20th-century Kenyan people
21st-century Kenyan people
Medallists at the 1998 Commonwealth Games